Crabbe Mountain is a Canadian alpine ski hill in Central Hainesville, New Brunswick near the intersection of Route 104 and Route 610. Crabbe Mountain was first skied in the spring of 1959 when three explored and cut the first trail on the mountain, Tippy Canoe.

At 853 feet, Crabbe Mountain offer New Brunswick's highest vertical features challenging terrain for skiers of all abilities. Crabbe Mountain has a wide-open beginner area with a pony lift for those just starting out. There's a wide variety of groomed, ungroomed, cruising trails and steep pitches. Crabbe offers many woods/glades runs, and they have some features such as tree rails, rock jumps and northshores. Crabbe also has three terrain parks. They have features such as jumps, hip transfers, spine transfers and rails and is one of the best terrain parks in the Maritimes.

The Crabbe Mountain base lodge offers a lounge, cafeteria, retail and rental shop. Ski and board lessons are available and the mountain is patrolled by the Canadian Ski Patrol.

Information

Trails

Crabbe also features 30 kilometres, 18+ miles of cross country skiing trails

Lifts

Crabbe has 1 Quad chair lift, 1 T-bar lifts and 1 rope tow.

Crabbe Mountain was originally serviced by rope tow, powered by an old truck engine. Through the years Crabbe has seen the addition of 2 T -bar lifts, and several versions of a rope tow. In 1987 a high speed quad was installed on the mountain, and increased lift capacity and speed greatly.

Terrain Park

Check out the Crabbe Mountain website for info: http://www.crabbemountain.com/mountain/terrain_park/

Race Club

Crabbe Mountain also has a very successful race club, it does extremely well in the atlantic circuit and has also won a few major competitions including a gold in Super G the Canadian nationals.

Summer 
With the addition of downhill mountain biking trails in 2006 Crabbe began to expand its operations into the summertime. Crabbe Mountain currently has 6 downhill mountain bike trails, serviced by a shuttle on select nights during the biking season. Many events such as a downhill mountain bike race, enduro bike race, and dirt bike hare scramble have taken place in the summer months since the trails have been built.

History
Crabbe Mountain is named after the first known owner of much of the property of Crabbe Mountain. Lemuel Jenkins Crabbe lived and worked in the area for most of his life from1799 to 1865. He lived on the property that is directly below the Crabbe parking lot and is buried in a small, out of the way cemetery on the property. Many of his descendants still live locally and some work at Crabbe Mountain.

Crabbe Mountain Winter Park Ltd. was incorporated on Dec.13th.,1961. The new facilities consist of a rope tow, three trails, tarpaper warming hut, ski school and a small number of shareholders. In its first year, Crabbe Mountain Winter Park Ltd. had a recorded income of $15.50.

In January 2013, a ski instructor  was killed when he collided with a skier at the bottom of a hill.

In 2015, The Wilson family sells Crabbe Mountain to a group of new local owners, who have a shared passion for the mountain. These new owners, as well as passionate members of the Crabbe community form a board of directors who oversee the direction and operations of the resort.

References

External links
Crabbe Mountain

Crabbe
Mountains of New Brunswick
Landforms of York County, New Brunswick
Tourist attractions in York County, New Brunswick
Mountains of Canada under 1000 metres